Yakky Doodle is a cartoon duck created by Hanna-Barbera Productions for the 1961 series The Yogi Bear Show. Yakky's name is a spoof of "Yankee Doodle".

History
Yakky Doodle (voiced by Jimmy Weldon using the same buccal speech technique used for the voice of Donald Duck) is an anthropomorphic yellow duckling with green wings who lives with his best friend and adoptive father Chopper the bulldog. Yakky is always one to run into danger when it is most expected. This usually comes in the form of the show's main antagonist Fibber Fox or secondary villain Alfy Gator. Chopper defends his "Little Buddy" fiercely, and is always ready to pound Fibber or any other enemy into oblivion if necessary. Yakky's tendency to put himself in great danger never draws a rebuke from Chopper, who presumably enjoys his protective role. One of Yakky's repeated lines is "Are you my mama?", and one of the songs Yakky loved to sing was "Ta-ra-ra Boom-de-ay".

The template for Yakky was Quacker, a similar duckling character voiced by Red Coffey who appeared in a number of classic Tom and Jerry theatrical cartoons, debuting in the 1950 short subject Little Quacker. Weldon, a former children's television series host and ventriloquist, had based this character on his "partner" Webster Webfoot. The same design was also used for a duckling in The Huckleberry Hound Show's Pixie and Dixie and Mr. Jinks segment "A Wise Quack" (Episode 48), as a blue duckling in Yogi Bear segment "Slumber Party Smarty" (Episode 2) and "Duck in Luck" (Episode 18) and as  the a purple duckling in the Loopy De Loop segment "This is my Ducky Day" (Episode 13).

Yakky debuted as Biddy Buddy in the "Slumber Party Smarty" and "Duck in Luck" episodes of the Yogi Bear segments of The Huckleberry Hound Show, and the "Gone to the Ducks", "Yuk Yuk Duck" and "Let's the Duck Out" episodes of the Augie Doggie and Doggie Daddy segments of The Quick Draw McGraw Show. He later had his own segment on The Yogi Bear Show in 1961 and he also appeared in the episode "Live and Lion" of the animated series Snagglepuss.

Main characters
Besides Yakky, the main characters in his cartoons are:

 Chopper (voiced by Vance Colvig impersonating Wallace Beery): A bulldog who always protects Yakky from harm and is also his adoptive father. If he thinks that the only way to do this is to send Yakky away, he's willing to pretend he is not the duckling's friend anymore; otherwise, he's the best friend Yakky has. Although he acts tough, in some ways he can be just as childlike as Yakky, such as when he wished he could fly like a bird. Chopper's repeated line is "Now, ain't that cute", as well as saying "Now close your eyes, Yakky. You shouldn't oughta see what I'm going to do to this fox/cat" before beating up Fibber or the cat. Another repeated quote is when Chopper feels guilty over having to turn Yakky away, and hopes that he didn't "hurt his feelings".
 Fibber Fox (voiced by Daws Butler impersonating Shelley Berman): A fox who first tried to use Yakky as a "bargaining chip" to get the chickens from a henhouse that Chopper was guarding; since then, he has been fixated on catching and eating Yakky, at one point saying that he now hates chicken and wants duck instead. He shows cunning in his plans, most of which are intended to get Chopper out of the way so he can have a clear run at Yakky. For all his predatory behavior, however, he may not be able to eat Yakky. In one episode, he finds that he just can't bring himself to cook or otherwise harm the little duckling, or even let another fox eat him.
 The Cat (also voiced by Daws Butler impersonating Shelley Berman): An unnamed cat who is an indirect kin to Fibber Fox also had a similar objective to eat Yakky. However, he often gets punished by Chopper or by the mistress of the house.
 Alfy Gator (voiced by Daws Butler impersonating Alfred Hitchcock): A blue alligator who tries to capture Yakky because his gourmet guidebook recommends roast duck. He tends to be verbose while setting his traps, probably as an imitation of Hitchcock's introductions on the TV show Alfred Hitchcock Presents. Also taken from that show is Hitchcock's silhouette & outline routine, which Alfy imitates in most of the cartoons he's in. One time he found himself competing with Fibber to catch Yakky, but the two predators eventually agreed to work together to capture the duck (the cartoon ended during the final chase, but presumably Yakky got away).

Episode list (The Yogi Bear Show)

Other appearances
 Yakky Doodle makes an appearance in Snooper and Blabber, Episode 31 "De-Duck-Tives".
 Yakky Doodle makes an appearance in Snagglepuss, Episode 3 "Live and Lion".
 In 1972, Yakky (voiced by Walker Edmiston) & Chopper was one of the dozens of characters to appear in the TV-movie Yogi's Ark Lark (which was part of The ABC Saturday Superstar Movie).
 Yakky Doodle only had three non-speaking cameo appearances (The Envy Brothers, Captain Swipe, Mr. Sloppy) in the subsequent series Yogi's Gang.
 In the late 1970s, Yakky Doodle (voiced by Frank Welker) appeared as a member of "The Yogi Yahooeys" team on Scooby's All-Star Laff-A-Lympics / Scooby's All-Stars and would often team up with Grape Ape in sporting competitions.
 In Yogi Bear's All Star Comedy Christmas Caper, Yakky Doodle (alongside Magilla Gorilla and Wally Gator) was unable to help Yogi Bear and his friends locate J. Wellington Jones.
 In 1987, Yakky & Chopper appeared at the start and end of the episode "Snow White and The 7 Treasure Hunters" on Yogi's Treasure Hunt.
 Originally Yakky Doodle intended to appear as a cameo during the final scene of the 1988 film Who Framed Roger Rabbit.
 Yakky Doodle appears in Harvey Birdman, Attorney at Law voiced by Steven Blum in most episodes and by Chris Edgerly in one episode.
 Yakky Doodle has appeared in comics as well. He can be seen on the covers of Marvel Comics' 1977 comic book series, "The Funtastic World of Hanna-Barbera" on the first and third issues.
 Yakky Doodle appeared in DC Comics Deathstroke/Yogi Bear Special #1 as a captured animal alongside other Hanna-Barbera characters.
 Yakky Doodle made a cameo appearance in the Animaniacs revival segment "Suffragette City".
 Yakky Doodle and Chopper appeared in Jellystone! with Yakky voiced by Katie Grober and Chopper voiced by Angelique Perrin. Yakky and Chopper are both females in this series and are portrayed as a family as Yakky refers to Chopper as her adoptive mother. Chopper is also revealed to be the proprietor of a pizzeria called the Cattanooga Cheese Explosion.

References

External links
Yakky Doodle's Toonopedia page
 

Hanna-Barbera characters
Animated characters introduced in 1960
Television characters introduced in 1960
Television series by Hanna-Barbera
Fictional ducks
Fictional orphans
Yogi Bear characters
Child characters in animated television series
Child characters in television
Male characters in animation